TJ Gottwaldov is the outdated name of two Czech sport clubs from Zlín:

FC Fastav Zlín - football club
RI OKNA Zlín - ice hockey team